Pei-heng Chiang (October 21, 1929 – January 3, 2008) was a Chinese-born American scholar.

Born in Hankou, China, Chiang emigrated to the United States and taught political science and political philosophy at Castleton State College in Castleton, Vermont, beginning in 1968, through 2000.  She was a leading scholar on the United Nations and wrote extensively on its functions, including Non Governmental Organizations.

Chiang died on January 3, 2008, in New York.

References

1929 births
2008 deaths
Castleton State College faculty
Chinese emigrants to the United States
Writers from Wuhan
United Nations experts
American women political scientists
American political scientists
Educators from Hubei
20th-century American women
American women academics
21st-century American women
20th-century political scientists